Jammāz ibn al-Ḥasan ibn Qatādah ibn Idrīs al-Ḥasanī was Emir of Mecca for a few months from 1253 to 1254.

Emir of Mecca
Jammaz sought the assistance of an-Nasir Yusuf, the Ayyubid Sultan of Damascus, against his cousin Abu Sa'd al-Hasan, the Emir of Mecca. Supported by Syrian troops Jammaz entered Mecca in Ramadan 651 AH (October/November 1253) and deposed and killed Abu Sa'd. However, he reneged on his promise to put al-Nasir's name in the khutbah, and instead continued the khutbah in the name of the Sultan of Yemen, al-Muzaffar Yusuf.

On the last day of Dhu al-Hijjah his uncle Rajih ibn Qatadah took the Emirate from him without resistance, and Jammaz fled to Yanbu.

Descendants
The later Emirs of Yanbu were from among his progeny.

Notes

References

13th-century Arabs
Sharifs of Mecca
Banu Qatadah